KATP is also the ATP-sensitive potassium channel responsible for pancreatic beta-cell insulin release.

KATP (101.9 FM, "The Bull") is a radio station serving the Amarillo, Texas, metro area with a country music format. It is owned by Townsquare Media.  Its studios are located on Southwest 34th Avenue in Southwest Amarillo, and its transmitter tower is based north of the city in unincorporated Potter County.

History
On March 27, 2017, KATP rebranded from "Blake FM" to "101.9 The Bull".

References

External links
101.9 The Bull

Country radio stations in the United States
ATP
Radio stations established in 1985
1985 establishments in Texas
Townsquare Media radio stations